Christophe Masike (born 5 June 1998) is a Zimbabwean cricketer. He made his Twenty20 debut for Mid West Rhinos in the 2018–19 Stanbic Bank 20 Series on 15 March 2019. In December 2020, he was selected to play for the Rhinos in the 2020–21 Logan Cup.

References

External links
 

1998 births
Living people
Zimbabwean cricketers
Mid West Rhinos cricketers
Place of birth missing (living people)